David Alan Johns (born 15 July 1956) is an English stand-up comedian, actor, and writer. He is best known for his breakthrough role as Daniel Blake in the 2016 Ken Loach film I, Daniel Blake.

Career
Johns has appeared on Never Mind the Buzzcocks (four times), 8 Out of 10 Cats, Rob Brydon's Annually Retentive, 28 Acts in 28 Minutes and, as an actor, he has appeared on Mud, Time Gentlemen Please, Inspector George Gently, and Harry Hill as God.

In 2009, he and Owen O'Neill dramatised Stephen King's Rita Hayworth and Shawshank Redemption for the Gaiety Theatre, Dublin.

In 2016, he starred as the title character in the Ken Loach film I, Daniel Blake in a critically acclaimed performance described as "powerful", "a welcome comic touch", and "all the more moving for its restraint". He later wrote a stage version of the film updated to the 2021/2022 cost of living crisis which will be premiered at the Northern Stage, Newcastle upon Tyne in May 2023.

Filmography

Film

Television

Awards and nominations

References

External links

1956 births
Living people
20th-century English male actors
21st-century English male actors
English male comedians
English male film actors
English male television actors
English male stage actors
People from Wallsend
Male actors from Tyne and Wear
Comedians from Tyne and Wear